Haryana Land Reclamation and Development Corporation, headquartered in Panchkula, is an entity of the Government of Haryana established to reclaim alkaline land, manage government owned farms, Bharat Petroleum gas agencies and petrol pumps as well as to sell supplies to farmers of the state. It has 3 Regional offices (Hisar, Karnal and Kaithal) and five managerial offices (Naraingarh, Rewari, Bhiwani, Hanumangarh and Faridabad). Its largest 1119 acres farm is based at Hisar.

History
Haryana Land Reclamation and Development Corporation Limited was incorporated on 27 March 1974 with the main objective of implementing the Land Reclamation Act and was tasked with reclamation of alkaline lands in the Haryana, management of agriculture farms, operation of Bharat gas agencies and petrol pumps, as well as the sale of gypsum (17 locations and 124 dealers), fertilizers, weedicides, pesticides and other agriculture inputs to the farmers of Haryana state.

Capabilities 
It manages a Shopping Complex at Naraingarh in Ambala, two petrol pumps at Naraingrah and Panipat, 4 gas agencies (Hisar, Faridabad and Naraingarh), and 11 farms totalling 1842 acres for producing the certified seeds to supply to the farmers of the state.

See also
 Central Sheep Breeding Farm, Hisar
 Central Institute for Research on Buffaloes (CIRB), Hisar
 Government Livestock Farm, Hisar
 National Research Centre on Equines, Hisar
 Regional Fodder Station, Hisar

References

1974 establishments in Haryana
State agencies of Haryana
Government agencies established in 1974